Pierrick Gunther (born 16 October 1989) is a French rugby union player. His position is Flanker and he plays for the Top 14 team Section Paloise.

References

1989 births
Living people
French rugby union players
Sportspeople from Roubaix
Rugby union flankers
RC Toulonnais players
Lyon OU players
Oyonnax Rugby players
AS Béziers Hérault players
Section Paloise players